Alain da Costa Soarès (1935 – 9 January 2023) was a Gabonese professional football manager and coach.

Career
Da Costa coached the USM Libreville and Vantour Mangoungou. Also he worked as manager of the Gabon U17 national team. From 1987 to 1989 and from 1994 to 1997 he led the Gabon senior national team. In June 2000 he again was a coach of the Gabonese Panthères.

From 2013 he worked as president of the Gabonese Football Federation.

Honours
USM Libreville
 Coupe du Gabon Interclubs: 1987

Gabon
 CEMAC Cup: 1988
 Africa Cup of Nations quarterfinals: 1996

Gabon U17
 African U-17 Championship: quarterfinals 1987

References

External links

Le football gabonais dans les années 1990 

1935 births
2023 deaths
Gabonese football managers
Gabon national football team managers
Place of birth missing
21st-century Gabonese people
1996 African Cup of Nations managers